Quibi was a short-lived American short-form streaming platform that generated content for viewing on mobile devices. It was founded in Los Angeles in August 2018 as NewTV by Jeffrey Katzenberg and was led by Meg Whitman, its CEO. The service raised $1.75 billion from investors.  It launched in April 2020, but shut down in December 2020 after falling short of its subscriber projections. In January 2021, Quibi's content library was sold to Roku, Inc. for less than $100 million. The platform's flawed concepts and rapid failure inspired widespread mockery.

History

Pre-launch
Quibi was founded in August 2018 as NewTV by Jeffrey Katzenberg and was led by Meg Whitman, its CEO. In October 2018, NewTV was renamed Quibi. The service targeted a younger demographic, with content delivered in 10-minute episodes called "quick bites" (with the name Quibi derived from "QUI-ck BI-tes"). In 2018, Quibi raised $1 billion in funding from major Hollywood film studios, TV companies, telecommunications companies, technology companies, banks, and other investors including The Walt Disney Company, 21st Century Fox, NBCUniversal, Sony Pictures, WarnerMedia, Viacom, RTL Group, FremantleMedia, eOne, Lionsgate, MGM, Madrone Capital, Goldman Sachs, JPMorgan Chase, Alibaba Group, Liberty Global and ITV.

In 2019, Quibi announced it would launch in April 2020 with two pricing tiers. On July 8, 2019, BBC Studios announced it had invested in Quibi. By late 2019, Quibi announced it had sold out its first-year advertising inventory, which amounted to $150 million.

In 2020, Quibi presented at CES on its full launch plans including details on its content, technology and partnerships. In March 2020, Quibi announced a partnership with Canadian telecommunications company BCE, whereby its Bell Media division would produce Canadian news and sports content for the service (via CTV News and TSN respectively), and Bell Mobility would be Quibi's exclusive Canadian telecom marketing partner.

Launch
Quibi launched on April 6, 2020. It was available in the United States and Canada. An ad-free U.S. version of the app was made available in the United Kingdom, Ireland, Australia, and Germany among others on April 6, 2020. TechCrunch reported that Quibi saw 300,000 downloads and "hit No. 3 in the App Store" on its launch day. On April 14, the company announced it had seen 1.7 million downloads of its app in its release week. In the Google Play store, Quibi was the 11th-most-downloaded app as of April 16.

Quibi's app fell out of the list of the 50 most-downloaded free iPhone apps in the United States a week after it was released. According to the analytics firm Sensor Tower, by early May, the app was ranked 125th. Sensor Tower also said the app had been installed by 2.9 million customers, although Quibi says the figure was closer to 3.5 million. Of those who had installed the app, Quibi says 1.3 million were active users. Katzenberg acknowledged the performance was "not close to what we wanted," stating, "I attribute everything that has gone wrong to coronavirus"—a reference to the COVID-19 pandemic that was disrupting daily routines at the time of the launch. Whitman was more positive in her assessment of the launch.

Moves were made to adjust the service by allowing users to share content on social media platforms and to watch shows on televisions in addition to phones. A feature was added to allow shows to be cast from phones onto TVs through AirPlay and Chromecast, with the screen orientation being set to landscape by default. Quibi also developed its own screenshotting function.

By early June, it was reported that the company implemented voluntary executive pay cuts. Katzenberg and Whitman stated that while Quibi was "in a good financial position" the company's senior executives volunteered to "take a 10% pay cut because it's the right thing to do." The company had reportedly avoided reducing its staffing levels, though the app had fallen out of the top 1,000 apps on Sensor Tower's rankings. That same month, it was reported that the service was on track for 2 million subscribers in its first year, far below its projected 7.4 million total. From January to mid-June, Quibi raised an additional $750 million in funding. In July 2020, Sensor Tower reported that about 8 percent of Quibi's early wave of users had converted into paying subscribers, while the subscription analytics firm Antenna reported that 27% of "Quibi day 1, 90-day trial users converted their trials," though Quibi stated that these numbers were inaccurate.

In early August, a free, ad-supported version of the service was released in Australia and New Zealand, and the price of the ad-free version was reduced. According to reports in The Wall Street Journal and Recode in September 2020, the platform was looking for a potential acquirer with other possibilities, such as raising more funds, or becoming a public company by backing into a shell corporation. The report stated Quibi had $200 million in funds available.

In October, Quibi was made available on Apple TV, Amazon Fire TV, and Google TV.

Shutdown
On October 21, 2020, just six months after Quibi's launch, The Wall Street Journal reported that the streaming service was shutting down. Later, that same day, this news was confirmed by both Katzenberg and Whitman. Katzenberg told Deadline Hollywood, "There was no question that keeping us going was not going to have a different outcome, it was just going to spend a whole lot more money without any value to show for it. So, out of respect for these people that put up this extraordinary amount of capital to do it, that's irresponsible and we both felt we shouldn't do it." In the interview, Katzenberg also cited the unfortunate timing of the launch during the pandemic as a contributing factor. At the time of the announcement, Quibi had approximately 500,000 subscribers.

The announcement of the shutdown left the fate of existing, upcoming, and planned original programming in "development hell" as Quibi does not own the rights to any of their programming, since their deals with the creators of their original programming allowed them to retain the copyright to their content and distribute it in traditional forms after a few years. The next day, on October 22, it was announced that Quibi would officially shut down "on or around" December 1.

Fate of the library
On January 3, 2021, it was announced that Roku was in advanced talks to acquire rights to Quibi's library. On January 8, 2021, Roku officially announced that all of Quibi's 75 programs would be streamed on their platform, The Roku Channel. Roku acquired the content from Quibi for an amount less than $100 million, with the condition that the content would remain in their short-form format. The shows would be rebranded as "Roku Originals", with 30 of them relaunched on the service on May 20, 2021.

Content

Quibi spent over $1 billion on commissioning original content in its first year, totalling 8,500 short-form episodes and including over 175 shows. Unlike many streaming video platforms, Quibi's content was made specifically for mobile devices and could be viewed in either a traditional 16:9 horizontal aspect ratio, or a 9:16 vertical frame (with the user able to shift between them in the same video). Instead of half-hour TV episodes or two-hour films, content on Quibi was delivered in episodes of 10 minutes or less.

Quibi commissioned significant news programming in addition to its entertainment line-up, but it found the news shows attracted minimal interest.

In July 2020, Quibi was nominated for 10 Emmy Awards across three categories: Outstanding Short Form Comedy or Drama Series, Outstanding Actor in a Short Form Comedy or Drama Series, and Outstanding Actress in a Short Form Comedy or Drama Series. Its series, #FreeRayshawn, won two Emmy Awards on September 20, 2020.

Reed Duchscher, CEO of Night Media, said that his company had attempted to bring YouTuber MrBeast's content to the platform, but Quibi rejected the proposal. Additionally, Rad Sechrist, creator of Kipo and the Age of Wonderbeasts, said that he and his production team talked to Quibi, but that they passed on the series.

Reception
Reactions to Quibi were mixed to negative. While most of the service's original programming received positive reviews, the service itself was criticized for its paid, mobile-only focus that limited its accessibility and reach compared to established, free services, such as YouTube and TikTok. In a November 2020 article for the Wall Street Journal, other reasons suggested for the service's shutdown include a misjudgment on which programming and technology features would appeal to young consumers, and a high spend on advertising. The platform's flawed concepts and rapid failure inspired widespread mockery.

Legal issues
Quibi filed a lawsuit against interactive video developer Eko on March 9, 2020 seeking a declaration that Quibi did not infringe on Eko's patented technology, as well as an order that Eko withdraw a complaint filed with Apple's App Store and unspecified monetary damages. Quibi pre-emptively filed its lawsuit, Quibi Holdings, LLC v. Interlude US, Inc. (d/b/a Eko), in the United States District Court for the Central District of California. Eko filed its own separate but related countersuit, JBF Interlude 2009 Ltd - Israel v. Quibi Holdings, LLC, a day later on March 10, alleging that Quibi stole proprietary technology after Eko demonstrated it to Quibi's employees, including Katzenberg.

On May 3, 2020, Elliott Management announced that it would fund Eko's lawsuit in exchange for equity in the company.

References

External links
 

2018 establishments in California
2020 disestablishments in California
American companies established in 2018
American companies disestablished in 2020
Internet properties established in 2018
Internet properties disestablished in 2020
Products and services discontinued in 2020
Companies based in Los Angeles
Internet television streaming services
Defunct video on demand services
Vertical video
Jeffrey Katzenberg